Untalkative Bunny is a co-produced animated series about a yellow anthropomorphic rabbit and its life in the big city (closely based on Ottawa, Ontario, Canada.). The show is aimed for kids 6-17. The series consists of small episodes (about 4–5 minutes long each) with a number up to four longer 'specials' in each season. Untalkative Bunny has been aired by Teletoon, as well as Disney Channel in many parts of the world, including the UK & France (excluding the US). The pilot episode was first seen in the first episode of Cartoon Sushi in 1997, and later in the KaBlam! episode "KaFun!" in 1999. It first aired on Teletoon on April 15, 2001. 
The first show was written by Karolina Craig and Jordan Craig with Graham Falk as creative Director and Board Supervisor. The episodes usually deal with Bunny and the problems of a modern life in the big city, and often features surrealist humour. The show covers topics of contemporary interest such as dieting, vegetarianism, racism, and environmentalism.

Other recurring characters include:
Squirrel: An orange Squirrel, who frequently pays visits to Bunny, and lives in the wild (as far as a city allows, such as city parks), but still with all the affordable modern comforts. He is sometimes accompanied by his son and daughter.
Emu: A grumpy, frustrated, and cantankerous blue emu who usually puts Bunny in bad situations.
Friendly Friend: An unknown pink creature who usually annoys Bunny.
Beaver: A purple beaver with the latest trends. His favourite sport is hockey.

65 five-minute episodes were made for the first season. A subsequent 2nd and 3rd season were made with Dawn Wilton supervising the co-writers from the first season, although many of the episodes in the third season were written solely by the UK co-producers, Big Al Productions. The series' soundtrack consists of a wide range of musical styles including bossa nova and jazz, written by Canadian composers David Burns and Wayne Bartlett.

Series overview

Episodes

Season 0 (1997)

Season 1 (2001)

Season 2 (2002-2003)

Season 3 (2003)

References

External links

2000s British animated television series
2000s British children's television series
2001 British television series debuts
2003 British television series endings
2000s Canadian animated television series
2000s Canadian children's television series
2001 Canadian television series debuts
2003 Canadian television series endings
Animated television series about rabbits and hares
Animated television series about squirrels
British children's animated comedy television series
Canadian children's animated comedy television series
Fictional mute characters
Teletoon original programming
Disney Channel (British and Irish TV channel) original programming
Television series by Mattel Creations
HIT Entertainment